Pyrausta perlelegans is a moth in the family Crambidae described by George Hampson in 1898. It is found in Colombia and Peru.

The wingspan is about 28 mm. The wings are pale hyaline (glass-like) yellow, the forewings with a bright purple costa.

References

Moths described in 1899
perlelegans
Moths of South America